List of the Apprentice 3 candidates may refer to:

 The Apprentice (American season 3)#Candidates
 The Apprentice (British series 3)#Candidates